Sicyopterus punctissimus is a species of goby endemic to Madagascar where it occurs in clear, fast-flowing rivers and streams.  This species can reach a length of  SL.

References

punctissimus
Freshwater fish of Madagascar
Taxonomy articles created by Polbot
Taxa named by John Stephen Sparks
Taxa named by Douglas W. Nelson
Fish described in 2004